Adelaide Zoo is Australia's second oldest zoo (after Melbourne Zoo), and it is operated on a non-profit basis. It is located in the parklands just north of the city centre of Adelaide, South Australia. It is administered by the Royal Zoological Society of South Australia Incorporated (trading as Zoos South Australia or Zoos SA), which is a full institutional member of the Zoo and Aquarium Association and the World Association of Zoos and Aquariums, and which also administers the Monarto Safari Park near Murray Bridge.

The zoo houses 2,500 animals comprising 250 native and exotic species. The zoo's most recent enclosures are in the second phase of the South-East Asia exhibit, known as Immersion, providing visitors with the experience of walking through the jungle, with Sumatran tigers and Sumatran orangutans seemingly within reach.

Five buildings within the zoo have been listed as state heritage places on the South Australian Heritage Register, including the front entrance on Frome Road and the former Elephant House. The zoo is also a botanical garden and the grounds contain significant exotic and native flora, including a Moreton Bay fig planted in 1877.

The giant panda exhibit, which opened in December 2009, is home to two giant pandas, Wang Wang and Funi, which will remain at the zoo until at least 2024.

History

Adelaide Zoo first opened on 23 May 1883, occupying  (now ) of land granted by the government. It was founded by the South Australian Acclimatization and Zoological Society. The society later became the Royal Zoological Society of South Australia after a royal charter was granted by King George VI in 1937.

The first director of the zoo (from 1882 to 1893) was R. E. Minchin. He was succeeded by his son A. C. Minchin (from 1893 to 1934), and grandson R. R. L. Minchin (from 1935 to 1940). Another grandson, Alfred Keith Minchin ran the private Koala Farm in the North Parklands from 1936 to 1960; the surplus koalas were set free on Kangaroo Island.

In the mid-twentieth century the zoo was involved in the export of live birds, with 99% of Australia's exports of live native birds, mainly finches and parrots for aviculture, passing through either Adelaide or Taronga (Sydney). At a time when the need for conservation of Australia's native birds, and control of their trade was becoming increasingly apparent, South Australia lagged behind other states in passing appropriate legislation.

In 1962 a new director of the zoo, William Gasking, was quickly dismissed through the power exerted by the Zoo Council president, Fred Basse, on the grounds that Gasking would not cooperate with the bird trade.  However, when Basse retired the trade in birds dropped to a tenth of what it had been two years before. Since then the zoo's administration has been restructured and the zoo has regained public credibility and scientific status.

The modern zoo has moved away from the traditional housing of species separately in pairs. Now species are grouped together as they would be in the wild, in exhibits that are carefully planned according to region. Enclosures have been designed with the needs of the animals in mind, providing a more natural habitat, which also serves an educational purpose for visitors. Although some of the zoo's heritage listed enclosures, such as the Elephant House that was built in 1900, have been retained, they are no longer used to house animals (the Elephant House now has educational signs). The last elephant housed at the Adelaide Zoo, Samorn, was moved to Monarto in 1991, where she died three years later.

The flamingo exhibit was opened in 1885, and is one of the few to have remained in the same position to date. Originally it was stocked with 10 flamingos, however, most died during a drought in 1915. In 2014, one of two surviving greater flamingos in the exhibit, thought to be the oldest in the world at 83 years of age, died. The remaining Chilean flamingo at Adelaide zoo, the last flamingo in Australia, which arrived in 1948, was humanely euthanised on 6 April 2018. 

The nocturnal house opened in 1974. The reptile house opened in 1985 and was expanded in 1993. The giant panda exhibit and Bamboo Forest opened in 2009. This replaced the former "South America Section" and ungulate paddocks. The former great ape compound behind the administration building was demolished and replaced by an education centre and "envirodome" through 2008-2009.

In 2010 main entrance was relocated off Frome Road in place of the hoofed animal yards, which were demolished. The famous polychrome masonry and cast-iron gates of the original entry, built in 1883 and restored in 1992, have been preserved. 

The zoo's restaurant is located in a brick building that was originally a monkey house. It was constructed in 1891, converted to a kiosk in 1936, and renovated in 1989.

Current focus

The zoo has a particular focus on species from the Gondwana "supercontinent" which later broke up into South America, India, Africa, Australia and South East Asia. The botanic similarities between the regions are featured in the zoo's main exhibits, which include a South East Asian Rainforest, and Australian Rainforest Wetlands walk-through aviary. The South East Asian precinct combines Malayan tapir and dusky leaf monkeys in a shared exhibit together. Other exhibits are immersed next to each-other such as those for northern white-cheeked gibbons and siamangs on neighboring rainforest lake islands.

The South East Asia Exhibit called Immersion was built in two parts. The first part was finished in 1995 which gave exhibits to animals such as siamangs and sun bears (the latter no longer held by the zoo). In late 2006 most of part two was finished which gave exhibits to Sumatran orangutans, siamangs and Sumatran tigers. There is also a large walk-through aviary which takes visitors past the two gibbon islands towards the tiger enclosures.

Adelaide Zoo has long been recognised for its impressive bird collection, but Australia's strict importation and quarantine laws make it unlikely that many exotic species will sustain genetically viable populations, a problem experienced by all zoos in the region. Importation of birds from overseas has been restricted in Australia since 1943, meaning additions to the exotic bird collection can only come from animals bred in the region or seized illegal imports, such as their hyacinth macaw specimen on exhibit. There are similar restrictions on acquiring many mammal species in Australia.   

The zoo also has a focus on educational programs. There is a selection of "get to know the zoo" type of tours, a large "children's zoo" area, and from April 2009, an educational area for secondary school students and their teachers. Schools can hire the facility and groups can sleep there, with a member from the zoo supervising. Also, a new educational area called the Envirodome opened in April 2009. Night walks, tours and animal research can be done. More information on the educational programs can be found on the zoo's web site. The education building in the northeast corner of the zoo replaced the old ape grottos.

Animals
Today the zoo houses 2,500 animals of 250 species. There were 1,300 animals of 282 species in 1990.
Asian Region

Asian small-clawed otter
Binturong
Blood python
Dusky leaf monkey
Elongated tortoise
Giant panda
Goodfellow's tree-kangaroo
Kalij pheasant
Komodo dragon
Malayan tapir
Northern white-cheeked gibbon
Red junglefowl
Red panda
Siamang
Sumatran orangutan
Sumatran tiger

South Australian Coast

Australian sea lion
Little penguin

Australian Region

Dingo
Emu
Kangaroo Island grey kangaroo
Koala
Red kangaroo
Short-beaked echidna
Southern cassowary
Southern hairy-nosed wombat
Swamp wallaby
Tammar wallaby
Tasmanian devil
Yellow-footed rock wallaby

Australian Nocturnal House

Brush-tailed bettong
Common ringtail possum
Eastern barn owl
Fat-tailed dunnart
Greater bilby
Greater stick-nest rat
Olive python
Spinifex hopping-mouse
Squirrel glider

Australian Reptiles and Frogs

Adelaide pygmy blue-tongued lizard
Australian green tree snake
Blue Mountains tree frog
Carpet python
Central bearded dragon
Desert death adder
Eastern blue-tongued lizard
Freshwater crocodile
Gippsland water dragon
Green tree python
Growling grass frog
Hosmer's spiny-tailed skink
Inland taipan
Merten's water monitor
Murray River short-neck turtle
Painted burrowing frog
Pernatty knob-tailed gecko
Pig-nosed turtle
Red eyed tree frog
Red-bellied black snake
Rosenberg's monitor
Splendid tree frog
Western swamp turtle
Woma python

Jewels of Asia Aviary

Black-capped lory
Black-winged stilt
Channel-billed cuckoo
Chattering lory
Dollarbird
Dusky lory
Emerald dove
Golden pheasant
Luzon bleeding-heart dove
Malabar parakeet
Noisy pitta
Palm cockatoo
Purple ground dove
Red lory
Rose-crowned fruit-dove
Rufous whistler
Sacred kingfisher
White-breasted ground dove

South-East Asian Aviary

Cattle egret
Eurasian coot
Green peafowl
Java sparrow
Lady Amherst's pheasant
Mandarin duck
Metallic starling
Nicobar pigeon
Pheasant coucal
Plum-headed parakeet

African Region

African lion
African spurred tortoise
Aldabra giant tortoise
Congo grey parrot
Eastern black-and-white colobus monkey
Egyptian goose
Fennec fox
Giraffe
Hamadryas baboon
Helmeted guineafowl
Mandrill
Meerkat
Namaqua dove
Orange-breasted waxbill
Pygmy hippopotamus
Radiated tortoise
Red fody
Red-billed firefinch
Red-cheeked cordon-bleu
Ring-tailed lemur
Serval
Southern red bishop
Yellow-collared lovebird
Yellow-fronted canary

American Region

Amazon tree boa
American alligator
Aruba island rattlesnake
Axolotl
Blue poison dart frog
Blue-and-yellow macaw
Blue-crowned parakeet
Bolivian squirrel monkey
Brazilian tapir
Brown-throated conure
Cane toad
Capybara
Corn snake
Crimson-bellied parakeet
Dyeing poison dart frog
Gila monster
Green anaconda
White-bellied parrot
Hyacinth macaw
Maned wolf
Maroon-bellied parakeet
Nanday parakeet
Patagonian mara
Red-bellied macaw
Rhinoceros iguana
Scarlet macaw
South American coati
Sun conure
Yellow-crowned amazon

Tamarin House

Cotton-top tamarin
Emperor tamarin
Golden lion tamarin
Pygmy marmoset

Birds of the Adelaide Hills Aviary

Bush stone-curlew
Diamond firetail
Peaceful dove
Regent honeyeater
Swift parrot

Australian Rainforest Birds Walkthrough Aviary

Australasian figbird
Australian king parrot
Buff-banded rail
Eclectus parrot
Pied imperial pigeon
Regent bowerbird
Satin bowerbird
Superb lyrebird
White-headed pigeon
Wonga pigeon

Ponds and Wetland Walkthrough Aviary

Australian pelican
Brolga
Cape Barren goose
Chestnut teal
Glossy ibis
Hardhead duck
Little pied cormorant
Pied heron
Plumed whistling duck
Royal spoonbill

Birds of the Australian Desert Aviary

Bourke's parrot
Budgerigar
Cockatiel
Inland dotterel
Pied honeyeater
Scarlet-chested parrot
White-plumed honeyeater

Other Australian Habitat Aviaries

Adelaide rosella
Australasian shoveler
Australian king quail
Australian bustard
Australian owlet-nightjar
Australian wood duck
Banded lapwing
Banded stilt
Bar-shouldered dove
Barking owl
Black-and-white fairywren
Black-breasted buttonquail
Black-eared miner
Blue-faced honeyeater
Blue-winged kookaburra
Brown cuckoo-dove
Brush bronzewing
Carnaby's black cockatoo
Chestnut-breasted mannikin
Cloncurry ringneck parrot
Crested bellbird
Crested pigeon
Crimson rosella
Diamond dove
Double-barred finch
Dusky woodswallow
Eastern grass owl
Eastern whipbird
Eastern yellow robin
Elegant parrot
Flock pigeon
Freckled duck
Gang-gang cockatoo
Golden-shouldered parrot
Gouldian finch
Green pygmy goose
Grey butcherbird
Hooded dotterel
Hooded parrot
Hooded robin
Laughing kookaburra
Long-billed corella
Long-tailed finch
Magpie goose
Major Mitchell's cockatoo
Malleefowl
Mulga parrot
Musk lorikeet
Naretha bluebonnet
New Holland honeyeater
Northern rosella
Olive-backed oriole
Orange-bellied parrot
Painted finch
Partridge pigeon
Port Lincoln ringneck parrot
Princess parrot
Purple-crowned lorikeet
Radjah shelduck
Rainbow bee-eater
Red-backed kingfisher
Red-browed finch
Red-capped parrot
Red-collared lorikeet
Red-tailed black cockatoo
Red-winged parrot
Rose-crowned fruit dove
Spinifex pigeon
Star finch
Superb fairy-wren
Superb parrot
Tawny frogmouth
White-browed woodswallow
White-winged triller
Yellow-tailed black-cockatoo

Variety Children's Zoo

Alpaca
Domestic chicken
Domestic goat
Domestic rabbit
Fallow deer
Guinea pig
Hermann's tortoise
Quokka
Spur-thighed tortoise

Envirodome
The Envirodome is an interactive visitor experience housed in the old Ape Block along with the Education Centre. The non-animal exhibits are hands-on and are aimed at the conservation of our environment, hoping to educate the public on simple changes they can make to help the environment. The building itself has been largely recycled and has a green roof, rain-water fed toilets, hay-bale walls and solar panels. Animals housed in the Environdrome include yellow seahorse.

Incidents
In January 1902, a keeper was seriously mauled by a brown bear (a species no longer kept by the zoo), having inadequately secured the animal before entering the enclosure. The bear was shot by fellow keepers and the man rushed to hospital where he slowly recovered (but lost his right arm and suffered serious other permanent injuries, but lived for another ten and a half years).

In September 1909, the Strand Magazine reported that a snake had swallowed a rug weighing almost 12 pounds, and which survived undamaged in the snake's stomach until disgorged almost a month later. The short article featured a photograph of the disgorged rug which was 5 feet 3 inches long.

In February 1920, a keeper was hosing the front of the polar bear enclosure (species no longer kept by the zoo) when one of the bears reached through the bars and grabbed the hose pulling the keeper forward and mauling him, severing his arm above the elbow. A. C. Minchin, the zoo director, and other staff intervened and freed the man who was then rushed to the hospital where he died two days later from his injuries.

In 1985, two men broke in and killed 64 animals.

In 2005, a boy was impaled when he tried to jump the spiked fence with his friends at night. He did not survive.

On 30 October 2008, a 78-year-old blind male greater flamingo named "Greater" was beaten, allegedly by a group of teenagers. Four teenagers were charged after visitors reported an incident to zoo staff. The flamingo was left "extremely stressed". "Greater", the last greater flamingo in Australia, died on 30 January 2014 at the estimated age of 83.

On Mother's Day 2009, the female orangutan, Karta, built an escape route out of plant material and tripped the hot wires with a stick. After a short while on the "outside" she dropped back into the exhibit with no harm done.

On 12 August 2022, a newly-arrived red panda, Ravi, escaped from its enclosure, before being located in a tree at the Botanic Park on 14 August. The red panda was tranquilised after keepers failed to entice it down with food.

On 11 October 2022, it was reported that Zoos SA was investigating the deaths of seven female quokkas and two yellow-footed rock wallabies during September. The cause of their deaths was believed to be plant toxicity.

Notable animals
The last captive Javan rhino was displayed at the Adelaide Zoo as an Indian rhinoceros due to the lack of knowledge about this species. It died in 1907.

The last American beaver at the zoo died in July 2010 and was the last beaver to be held at any zoo (or anywhere) in Australia.

Miss C, the last Hoffmann's two-toed sloth in Australia and the oldest in the world died in June 2017 aged 43.

Wang Wang and Funi are two giant pandas on loan to Adelaide Zoo in Australia, as part of a conservation program to protect endangered wildlife.

Yiray the quokka, one of the Australia-native threatened species at the Adelaide Zoo, gave birth to a baby in March 2022.

See also
 List of zoos in Australia

Notes

References
 Robin, Libby. (2001). The Flight of the Emu: a hundred years of Australian ornithology 1901-2001. Melbourne University Press: Carlton. 
 "Fact file of the Adelaide Zoo"

External links
 
 

 
1883 establishments in Australia
Zoos established in 1883
Zoo
Zoos in South Australia
Buildings and structures in Adelaide
Adelaide Park Lands